"Here's Some Love" is a song written by Richard Mainegra and Jack Roberts, and recorded by American country music artist Tanya Tucker.  It was released in June 1976 as the first single and title track from the album Here's Some Love.

Chart performance
The single was Tucker's sixth number one on the country chart.  "Here's Some Love" peaked on the Hot 100 at number eighty-two and went to number twenty-five on the Adult Contemporary chart.

Weekly charts

Year-end charts

References

Tanya Tucker songs
1976 singles
MCA Records singles
Song recordings produced by Jerry Crutchfield
1976 songs
Songs written by Richard Mainegra